Snarl is a notification system for Windows inspired by Growl that allows applications to display alpha-blended messages on the screen.

Unlike other forms of notification, Snarl does not hijack the current focused window, nor does it force the taskbar to be visible. Notifications can either be canceled by clicking on them, or left to disappear automatically if ignored for a period of time.

Snarl can display several messages at any one time; new messages are simply displayed beneath (or above) existing ones. An application can display any number of messages, and can update the content, icon, and time the message appears for any particular message at any time and explicitly remove the message if required. Applications can also request to be notified if a user clicks on a particular message.

Developers of other applications can include Snarl support in their applications with almost no effort at all - Snarl uses Windows window messaging functionality to show and hide notifications, making it accessible to any programming language from low-level pure C to high-level Visual Basic 6 or .NET-based environments.

Features
 Unicode support
 Windows XP and Vista 32-bit & 64-bit support
 Multiple notifications support
 Notification position can be adjusted
 Substitute native Windows tooltip with Snarl Notification

Applications supported by Snarl
 Commit Monitor
 dotWidget
 Firefox
 Floola
 foobar2000
 iTunes
 Jungle Disk
 Launchy
 Miranda NG (support up to 0.7.x)
 mIRC
 MusicBee
 Pidgin
 Process Controller
 Quintessential Player
 Ruby (programming language)
 Songbird
 Sunbird
 Spotify
 Task Coach
 Thunderbird
 Winamp
 Windows Live Messenger
 Witty

Snarl-Specific applications
 SnarlClock (included with Snarl)
 SnarlTray (included with Snarl)

External links
 
 Developer Guide
 Source Code (CVS)

Windows-only free software
Free system software